Yas'ur (lit. petrel) is a kibbutz in northern Israel. Located east of Acre in the Western Galilee, it falls under the jurisdiction of Mateh Asher Regional Council.

History
The kibbutz was established in 1949 by Jewish immigrants from Hungary who were members of the Zionist Socialist youth movement Hashomer Hatzair; they were joined in 1951 by another group of immigrants from England and in 1956 by another group from Brazil. The parents of Israeli historian Benny Morris were among the founders of the kibbutz, shortly after his birth.

The kibbutz was established on the  land of the depopulated  Palestinian village of Al-Birwa, and it uses the land of the depopulated villages of Al-Damun  and Al-Ruways  for agriculture.

Yasur's economy was based on textile and toy factories, which became unprofitable and closed down. In 2003 the kibbutz began a process of renewal and launched a successful membership drive. An Italian restaurant, Liliana's, is located on the grounds of the kibbutz.

Notable people

 Lynne Reid Banks
 Benny Morris

References

External links
Kibbutz website 

Hungarian-Jewish culture in Israel
Kibbutzim
Kibbutz Movement
Populated places established in 1949
Populated places in Northern District (Israel)
1949 establishments in Israel